The 10th Edward Jancarz Memorial was the 2007 version of the Edward Jancarz Memorial. It took place on 16 June in the Stal Gorzów Stadium in Gorzów Wielkopolski, Poland. The Memorial was won by Jason Crump who beat Chris Harris, Leigh Adams and Andreas Jonsson in the final.

Heat details 
 16 June 2007 (Saturday)
 Best Time: 63.91 - Leigh Adams in Heat 9
 Attendance:
 Referee: Ryszard Bryła

Changes:
 (14) Wiesław Jaguś (TOR) → Jonsson
 (12) Fredrik Lindgren (ZIE) → Kasprzak
 (5) Tomasz Gollob (TAR) → Walasek
 (3) Rune Holta (TAR) → Ułamek

Heat after heat 
 Crump, Dobrucki, Hampel, Ułamek
 Harris, Ferjan, Walasek, Sullivan
 Kasprzak, Lindbaeck, Okoniewski, Ruud
 Jonsson, Adams, Jensen, Świst
 Crump, Lindbaeck, Świst, Brzozowski, Walasek (T/-)
 Ruud, Jonsson, Sullivan, Hampel
 Okoniewski, Ułamek, Jensen, Ferjan
 Adams, Dobrucki, Harris, Kasprzak
 Adams, Crump, Sullivan, Okoniewski
 Kasprzak, Walasek, Jensen, Hampel
 Harris, Jonsson, Lindbaeck, Ułamek
 Ferjan, Dobrucki, Świst, Ruud
 Crump, Kasprzak, Ferjan, Jonsson
 Hampel, Harris, Okoniewski, Świst
 Adams, Walasek, Ułamek, Ruud
 Sullivan, Jensen, Lindbaeck, Dobrucki
 Jensen, Harris, Ruud, Crump (d/start)
 Adams, Hampel, Ferjan, Lindbaeck
 Sullivan, Ułamek, Kasprzak, Świst
 Jonsson, Dobrucki, Walasek, Okoniewski
 The Final (top four riders)
 Crump, Harris, Adams, Jonsson (T)

See also 
 motorcycle speedway
 2007 in sports

References

External links 
 (Polish) Stal Gorzów Wlkp. official webside

Memorial
2007
Edward J